Oleksandr Dmytruk is a Ukrainian retired footballer.

Career
Oleksandr Dmytruk started his career in 1997 with Veres Rovno and Borysfen Boryspil. He played also for Borysfen Boryspil, Ros Bila Tserkva, Borisfen-2 Boryspil. In 2003 he moved to Desna Chernihiv the main club in Chernihiv, where he played 2 games and scored 1 goal. Then he moved to Boreks-Borysfen and Borisfen-2 Boryspil in the same season. In summer 2004 he moved back to Borysfen Boryspil where he played 29 matches and scored 1 goal and in 2005 he moved to Obolon Kyiv, where he played 4 matches.

References

External links 
 Oleksandr Dmytruk footballfacts.ru
 Oleksandr Dmytruk allplayers.in.ua

1980 births
Living people
FC Desna Chernihiv players
FC Ros Bila Tserkva players
FC Obolon-Brovar Kyiv players
FC Systema-Boreks Borodianka players
Ukrainian footballers
Ukrainian Premier League players
Ukrainian First League players
Ukrainian Second League players
Association football midfielders